Rafael "Rafa" Tresaco Blasco (born 24 August 2000) is a Spanish professional footballer who plays as a forward for SD Huesca B.

Club career
Tresaco was born in Sabiñánigo, Huesca, Aragon, and started his career at Real Zaragoza in 2010, aged ten. On 19 February 2019, after failing to agree terms on a new contract, he left the club and joined Racing de Santander.

On 10 April 2019, Tresaco was promoted to Racing's first team to cover for injured Jon Ander. He made his senior debut eleven days later, coming on as a late substitute for Alberto Noguera in a 1–1 Segunda División B home draw against SD Amorebieta.

Assigned to the reserves for the 2019–20 campaign, Tresaco made his professional debut on 4 January 2020, replacing Jon Ander late into a 0–0 away draw against CD Mirandés in the Segunda División. On 2 October, he joined Marbella FC in the third division.

References

External links

2000 births
Living people
People from Alto Gállego
Sportspeople from the Province of Huesca
Spanish footballers
Footballers from Aragon
Association football forwards
Segunda División players
Primera Federación players
Segunda División B players
Tercera División players
Tercera Federación players
Rayo Cantabria players
Racing de Santander players
Marbella FC players
Algeciras CF footballers
SD Huesca B players